Awa Karamoko (born 12 April 1985) is an Ivorian international team handball player.

Career
Karamoko has played on the Ivorian national team. She participated at the 2011 World Women's Handball Championship in Brazil.

References

1985 births
Living people
Ivorian female handball players